Alejo Mancisidor (born 31 July 1970) is a former professional tennis player from Spain.

Career
Mancisidor played NCAA tennis while at Pepperdine University and was an All-American.

He was a quarter-finalist at the Guarujá Open in 1992, with wins over Peru's Jaime Yzaga and German Marc-Kevin Goellner.

The right-hander played Jeff Tarango in the opening round of the 1992 US Open and was beaten in five sets.

He defeated Yzaga again in 1994, at the Bancolombia Open, when the Peruvian was ranked 19th in the world.

Coach 
Mancisidor coached WTA top 10 player Garbiñe Muguruza between 2010 and 2015.

Challenger titles

Singles: (2)

References

1970 births
Living people
Spanish male tennis players
Pepperdine Waves men's tennis players
Sportspeople from San Sebastián
Spanish tennis coaches
Tennis players from the Basque Country (autonomous community)